Berrimah Power Station is a kerosene-fuelled power station in  Berrimah, an industrial suburb of Darwin, Northern Territory, Australia. It is owned by the government-owned Power and Water Corporation, and generates electricity only on an emergency and standby basis.

The Berrimah Power Station was built and commissioned in 1979 after a number of faults with the Stokes Hill Power Station.

Originally, it had 30MW capacity (3 × 10MW) but , only one unit is still operational, with the other two having been decommissioned.

References

External links
Power and Water

Natural gas-fired power stations in the Northern Territory
Buildings and structures in Darwin, Northern Territory
Economy of Darwin, Northern Territory
1979 establishments in Australia